Frédéric Jérôme de La Rochefoucauld (1701–1757) was a French cardinal.

1701 births
1757 deaths
18th-century French cardinals
Archbishops of Bourges
People of the Ancien Régime